South Gyeongsang Province is a province in the southeast of South Korea. The provincial capital is at Changwon. It is adjacent to the major metropolitan center and port of Busan. The UNESCO World Heritage Site Haeinsa, a Buddhist temple that houses the Tripitaka Koreana and tourist attraction, is located in this province. Automobile and petrochemical factories are largely concentrated along the southern part of the province, extending from Ulsan through Busan, Changwon, and Jinju.

Etymology
The name derives ; . The name derives from the names of the principal cities of Gyeongju and Sangju.

History

Before 1895, the area corresponding to modern-day South Gyeongsang Province was part of Gyeongsang Province, one of the Eight Provinces of Korea during the Joseon dynastic kingdom. In 1895, southern Gyeongsang was replaced by the districts of Jinju in the west and Dongnae (modern-day Busan) in the east. In 1896, they were merged to form South Gyeongsang Province.

The provincial capital was originally at Jinju; it moved in 1925 to Busan.During the Japanese rule of Korea, the province was known as Keishōnan-dō. In 1948, South Gyeongsang Province became part of South Korea. In 1963, Busan separated from South Gyeongsang Province to become a Directly Governed City (Jikhalsi). In 1983, the provincial capital moved from Busan to Changwon.

In 1995, Busan became a Metropolitan City (Gwangyeoksi), and Ulsan separated from South Gyeongsang Province to become a Metropolitan City in 1997.

Geography
The province is part of the Yeongnam region, on the north by North Gyeongsang Province, on the west by North Jeolla Province and South Jeolla Province, and on the south by the Korea Strait far from Nagasaki Prefecture, Japan. Most of the province is drained by the Nakdong River and its tributaries.

Demographics

Resources

The Nakdong delta plain around Gimhae is one of the best granaries in South Korea. Agricultural products form Gyeongsangnam-do include rice, beans, potatoes, and barley. The area is renowned for its cotton, sesame, and fruits which are grown along the southern seaside. A number of marine products are caught. The province is one of the country's leading fisheries.

Major cities
The largest cities in the region are Busan and Ulsan, which are separately administered as provincial-level Metropolitan Cities. Apart from the capital Changwon, other large or notable cities include Gimhae and Jinju.

Attractions

Gyeongsangnam-do is the home of Haeinsa, a Buddhist temple that houses the Tripitaka Koreana and attracts many tourists. It is in the national park around Jirisan (1,915 m) on the border with Jeollabuk-do. The temple was first built in 802.

Changnyeong County contains three major tourist attractions for the province: Upo Wetland, the natural hotsprings of Bugok, and Hwawangsan.

Yangsan-si contains two major temples for the province: Tongdosa and Naewon Temple

Administrative divisions

Gyeongsangnam-do is divided into 8 cities (si) and 10 counties (gun). The names below are given in English, hangul, and hanja.

Sister districts
  Yamaguchi Prefecture (July 26, 1987)
  Maryland (November 18, 1991)
  Shandong (September 8, 1993)
  East Java (May 9, 1996)
  Đồng Nai Province (September 1, 1996)
  Khabarovsk Krai (September 14, 1996)
  Jalisco (March 10, 1997)
  Laguna province (April 15, 1997)
  Pomeranian Voivodeship (April 22, 1997)
  Fejér County (April 24, 1997)

See also
Igeum-dong site - complex archaeological site in Sacheon-si
 Gyeongsang National University
Tongyeong International Music Festival

References

External links

 

 
Provinces of South Korea